Testex, stylized as TESTEX, is a globally operating, independent Swiss testing and certification organisation that focuses on textile testing. The Testex corporate group is headquartered in Zurich and consists of the Testex AG, ÖTI GmbH (Austria), PT Testex (Indonesia), Swiss Textile-Testing Ltd. Hong Kong, and Testex Testing Co. Ltd. Beijing. Testex AG emerged from the "Seidentrocknungsanstalt Zurich" founded in 1846, and operates more than 20 branches worldwide. Testex is the official representative of the Oeko-Tex Association in Australia, Canada, the P.R. China, Hong Kong, Indonesia, Malaysia, New Zealand, the Philippines, Switzerland, South Korea and Taiwan.

Operations

Analytical Testing 
The analytical laboratory at Testex is ISO 17025 certified and conducts a variety of analytical tests designed to detect pollutants, residues, and trace elements in textiles. Testing and auditing are also conducted in accordance with the guidelines specified by the Oeko-Tex Association. These include Standard 100 by Oeko-Tex, Step, Made in green, Eco passport, Allergy Standards and the Leather standard. The product portfolio is continually adapted according to the current market needs.

Physical and Chemical Textile Testing 
Testex conducts physical and chemical tests on fibers, yarns/ strings, woven fabrics, knitted fabrics, nonwoven fabrics, and finished products. The services also include physiological tests on textile fabrics and ready-made textiles, flooring tests and the testing of personal protective equipment (PPE) in accordance with ISO 17065, which involves various flaming tests.

History

1846-1869 Founding of the Silk Conditioning Institute

Present-day Testex AG was founded as the Zurich Silk Conditioning Institute in 1846. The initiative to establish the silk conditioning institute came from representatives of the Zurich silk industry. Unlike the institutes in Lyon or Turin, the Zurich silk conditioning institute was not founded as a public institute, but as a public limited company. In the case of the silk conditioning institute, the shareholders were a small group of people from the silk industry who were known to one another – merchants, bankers and manufacturers.

The reason for founding the silk conditioning institute was the intent to combat silk fraud, which was a common practice at the time. Silk conditioning institutes had previously been established in both Turin and in Lyon, which had an active silk trade. Especially for an expensive raw material such as silk, there was a lot of interest amongst manufacturers and merchants alike in developing a reliable standard for determining the actual dry weight. The founders of the silk conditioning institute and Zurich’s silk industry benefited in many respects from the experiences of the existing silk conditioning institutes, for example with regard to the company’s operational processes or technical equipment.

The silk conditioning institute in Lyon had been working on improving the drying procedure since the 1820s, under pressure from the Chamber of Commerce. Joseph Léon Talabot’s numerous trials represented a real breakthrough for silk drying. The silk industry in Zurich followed these technical innovations, and the silk conditioning institute began using them soon thereafter.
 
On 1 July 1847, the silk conditioning institute started its operations. In spite of the technical retrofitting, the silk conditioning institute scarcely managed to satisfy demand. The Talabot system had significantly reduced the drying time in comparison with earlier methods. However, drying still took several hours. Furthermore, the conditioning institute frequently had to determine the commercial weight for the Basel ribbon industry. In order to relieve the pressure here at least, a branch was opened in Basel on 1 October 1849. Therefore, the news of a technical refinement of the Talabot apparatus was met with great interest in the middle of the 1850s. The new apparatus, which was known under the name “Talabot-Persoz-Rogeat apparatus” met with both approval and scepticism in specialist circles.
 
The silk industry usually required a lot of manpower and employed thousands of people. The silk conditioning institute, on the other hand, only employed a few people. In spite of the new machine technology, the procedure was not the same in all silk conditioning institutes.
 
By the middle of the 1850s, the institute’s core business was determining the commercial weight of raw silk. In the course of the ongoing industrialisation and the development of new trading centres and markets, the Zurich silk conditioning institute faced new tasks. Unfamiliar or new procedures for the production of fibres were a constant source of new challenges for merchants and manufacturers. The idea of the "Zurich Silk Industry Association" (ZSIG) of adding a silk testing institute, i.e. an institute for textile testing, to the existing silk conditioning institute greatly extended the field of activity. In view of the increasing shortage of space in Talgasse, these plans were shelved for the timing being. This project was only taken up again in the 1870s.

1870-1919 Heyday of the silk industry

The years of high industrialisation between 1870 and 1919 were an eventful time for the silk conditioning institute in Zurich. The tightened competition in Switzerland and abroad increased the pressure on the companies to be profitable. From 1872, the institute not only checked the moisture and the weight, but also the fineness and the strength of the silk fibres.
 
Another pillar of the Zurich silk conditioning institute evolved with expansion of the shipping service, i.e. the transportation of freight, and the expansion of the warehouse business. The increased competition in the Canton of Zürich initially brought the silk conditioning institute a rising order volume. The constant growth in the production volume was made possible not least by the mechanisation of the textile industry. From the start of this period of expansion at the beginning of the 1870s, the silk conditioning institute headed into financial difficulties and soon needed a new managing director.

The silk conditioning institute was also represented on a supraregional level at conventions and annual meetings of the European silk conditioning institutes. There, it primarily advocated a standardisation of the procedures and measures. Work was rationalised in the Zurich silk conditioning institute by the advancing industrialisation. The management and the administrative board pushed the continuous development of the technical facilities.

Shortly before the First World War, the Zurich silk conditioning institute was the conditioning institute with the fourth highest turnover, behind Lyon, and the Milan "Società anonima Cooperativa" and "Stagionatra seta Oriani" institutes. The most important export market for the Zurich silk conditioning institute at the time was England. Between 1895 and 1913, the major part of the goods had been sold on the London market, which was a very important trading centre due to the size of the British Empire.
 
In general, the First World War triggered a large number of transformations and changes, which also had an effect on the Swiss silk industry. As a neutral state encircled by warring powers, Switzerland and its economy were dependent on trading relationships with the states that were directly involved in the war. The political events had a direct influence on the institute’s business. The Swiss economy benefited temporarily from the war. But the increasing inflation of the European currencies and difficulties with regard to sales, trade and communication that were caused by the war still led to losses. There were significant cuts in the profits due to war taxes. The war had both a social and a political effect. Due to the shortage of young men on the labour market, the proportion of women employed by the institute rose significantly during the war.

World War II 
While the transition from a peacetime economy to a wartime economy posed fewer issues in World War II than it did in World War I, the war years were even tougher for the silk trade. As a national economy, Switzerland was largely cut off from foreign markets. While the silk trade was exempt from rationing measures, it was subordinated to the Swiss Textile Syndicate along with all other branches of the textile industry. The export guarantee issued by the Swiss Federal Council eased the situation for exports only. Starting in 1944, silk experienced a certain upswing due to the temporary shortage of wool and cotton. Following the war, the silk business began to flourish once again. Large supplies of Italian silk were exported to Switzerland, which stimulated the local economy.

Present

Decline of the Swiss Silk Industry 

Following the development of synthetic fibers, particularly after World War II, the Swiss silk industry began processing less and less real silk. As a result, the demand for traditional silk drying methods declined significantly. In 1970, the company responded to the shifting market conditions by focussing on textile testing and changing its name to Testex AG. This laid the foundation for a new reorganization to a modern testing institute. In 1993, Testex joined the Oeko-Tex Association and began conducting human ecological tests on textiles.

Testex Today 
Today, little remains of the silk drying institute. The boom eras of Zurich's silk industry are a thing of the past, and the Swiss textile industry has long been in decline. The "Seidentrocknungsanstalt", however, has managed to avoid a similar fate. Today, Testex AG is one of the largest textile testing companies in the world, and has experienced significant growth since the turn of the century. At the end of 2006, Testex AG engaged 66 employees, whereas in 2017 the company employs over 200 people in 20 locations worldwide.

References

Bibliography
 Hans Jenny, Hundert Jahre Seidentrocknungs-Anstalt Zürich. 1846–1946, Zürich: Orell Füssli AG 1946 (German)

External links 
  

Companies based in Zürich
Textile industry